The Saskatchewan Huskies women's ice hockey team represents the University of Saskatchewan in U Sports women's ice hockey. The Huskies compete in the Canada West Universities Athletic Association Conference in the U Sports athletic association. Home games are contested at the Merlis Belsher Place.

History
Women have been playing hockey at the University as early as 1912. During the 2009–10 season, Breanne George scored a conference-high 28 goals and 18 assists for a league-leading 46 points in 24 games. Fifth-year Huskies forward Julie Paetsch was named the 2011–12 Canada West women’s hockey Player of the Year. The Huskies alternate captain, Paetsch finished the season as the Canada West leader in scoring with 34 points. Her 14 goals and 20 assists were accumulated in 24 games as the Huskies enjoyed a won-loss record of 16–6–2. Her seven power play goals ranked third overall in the CIS, while her 113 shots led all CIS skaters. In ten contests, she had multiple point games, while logging three or more points on four separate occasions. It marked the second time in Saskatchewan history that a skater has been named Canada West MVP. Breanne George claimed the award in 2009–10.

Kelsey Tulloch was the 2012 Canada West nominee for the Marion Hilliard Award. She accumulated eight points as the Huskies qualified for their fifth consecutive playoff appearance. Tulloch was named a four-time All-Academic, while representing her team on the Huskie Athletics Council.

U Sports Tournament results

Awards and honours
Breanne George, 2010 Canada West scoring champion

University Awards
2008 Colb McEwon Trophy (Saskatchewan Huskies Athletics Coach of the Year): Steve Kook and Wayne Grund 
2014 Colb McEwon Trophy (Saskatchewan Huskies Athletics Coach of the Year): Steve Kook
2020 Patricia Lawson Trophy (awarded to Huskies Female Rookie of the Year): Halle Krynowsky

Canada West All-Stars

Canada West All-Rookie Team

Canada West awards

U Sports honours
2007, 2009, 2010 Canadian Interuniversity Sport Academic All-Canadian, Chelsea Purcell
 2008 University of Saskatchewan Huskies Women's Hockey Alumni Award, Chelsea Purcell
Breanne George, 2010 CIS MVP
2010 CIS First Team, Forward, Breanne George
2010 CIS Second Team, Julie Paetsch
2011 CIS First Team, Forward, Breanne George
 Julie Paetsch, CIS First Team All-Star (2011–12)
 Julia Flinton 2015-16 U Sports First Team All-Canadian
Kaitlin Willoughby, 2018 U SPORTS Women’s Hockey Championship Tournament All-Star Team

Notable alumni 
Sylvia Fedoruk: 17th Lieutenant Governor of Saskatchewan
Shannon Miller: Head Coach for Canada in Ice hockey at the 1998 Winter Olympics – Women's tournament

International 
Breanne George, Forward :  2011 Winter Universiade 
Julia Flinton : 2015 Winter Universiade 
Kaitlin Willoughby, Forward, : 2017 Winter Universiade 
Leah Bohlken, Forward, : 2019 Winter Universiade
Jessica Vance, Goaltender, : Ice hockey at the 2019 Winter Universiade

Huskies in professional hockey

References

U Sports women's ice hockey teams
Ice Hockey, Women's
Ice hockey teams in Saskatchewan
Women's ice hockey teams in Canada
Women in Saskatchewan